Cribrohammus fragosus is a species of beetle in the family Cerambycidae. It was described by Holzschuh in 1998.

References

Agapanthiini
Beetles described in 1998
Taxa named by Carolus Holzschuh